Below is a sortable list of compositions by Mikhail Glinka.  The works are categorized by genre, date of composition and titles.

{| class="sortable wikitable" style="margins:auto; width=95%;"
|-
!width="95"| Genre
!width="75"|Date
!width=| Russian title (original title)
!width=| English title
! style="width:220px;"| Scoring
! style="width:340px;"| Notes
|- valign="top"
| Stage || align=center|1834–1836 || Жизнь за царя || A Life for the Tsar ||  || Opera in 5 acts; new version (1837) in 4 acts and epilogue; original title: Ivan Susanin
|- valign="top"
| Stage || align=center|1836 || Ария с хором для дамы К. А. Бахтурина «Молдаванка и цыганка, или Золото и кинжал» || Aria with Chorus for Konstantin Bakhturin's Play "The Moldavian Girl and the Gypsy Girl" ||  ||
|- valign="top"
| Stage || align=center|1837–1842 || Руслан и Людмила || Ruslan and Lyudmila ||  || Opera in 5 acts after Alexander Pushkin; 2nd version 1846
|- valign="top"
| Stage || align=center|1840 || Музыка к трагедии Н. В. Кукольника «Князь Холмский»  || Prince Kholmsky  || for orchestra        3. for voice and orchestra  4. for voice and orchestra     6. for voice and orchestra    || Incidental music for the tragedy by Nestor Kukolnik
|- valign="top"
| Stage || align=center|1841 || Тарантелла || Tarantella || for narrator, chorus and orchestra || words by Ivan Myatlev (Иван Петрович Мятлев)
|- valign="top"
| Orchestra || align=center|1822–1826? || Увертюра D-dur || Overture in D major || for orchestra ||
|- valign="top"
| Orchestra || align=center|1822–1826? || Увертюра g-moll || Overture in G minor || for orchestra ||
|- valign="top"
| Orchestra || align=center|1823? || Andante cantabile и Rondo || Andante cantabile and Rondo in D minor || for orchestra ||
|- valign="top"
| Orchestra || align=center|1824? || Симфония B-dur || Symphony in B major || for orchestra || unfinished
|- valign="top"
| Orchestra || align=center|1834 || Симфония на две русские темы || Symphony on Two Russian Themes in D minor || for orchestra || unfinished; completed and orchestrated by Vissarion Shebalin
|- valign="top"
| Orchestra || align=center|1839, 1856 || Вальс-фантазия || Waltz-Fantasia in B minor || for orchestra || a.k.a. Valse-Fantaisie; original version for piano (1839); orchestrated in 1845 (lost); reorchestrated in 1856
|- valign="top"
| Orchestra || align=center|1845 || Испанская увертюра № 1 «Блестящее каприччио на тему Арагонской хоты» || Spanish Overture No. 1 "Capriccio Brilliante on the Jota Aragonesa" || for orchestra ||
|- valign="top"
| Orchestra || align=center|1848 || Камаринская || Kamarinskaya, Scherzo /  Fantasia on Two Russian Themes || for orchestra || arranged for piano 4-hands (1856)
|- valign="top"
| Orchestra || align=center|1848 || Recuerdos de Castilla || Recuerdos de Castilla || for orchestra || first version of Spanish Overture No. 2
|- valign="top"
| Orchestra || align=center|1851 || Испанская увертюра № 2 «Воспоминания о летней ночи в Мадриде» || Spanish Overture No. 2 "Recollection of a Summer Night in Madrid" || for orchestra || a.k.a. Souvenir d'une nuit d'été à Madrid
|- valign="top"
| Orchestra || align=center|1855 || Польский || Polonaise on a Spanish Bolero Theme in F major || for orchestra ||
|- valign="top"
| Orchestra || align=center| || Concerto || Concerto in E major || for orchestra || unfinished
|- valign="top"
| Chamber music || align=center|1823? || Септет || Septet in E major || for oboe (or clarinet), horn, bassoon, two violins (or violin and viola), cello and double bass ||
|- valign="top"
| Chamber music || align=center|1824 || Квартет D-dur || String Quartet in D major || for 2 violins, viola and cello ||
|- valign="top"
| Chamber music || align=center|1825–1828 || Соната для фортепьяно и альта || Sonata in D minor || for viola and piano || unfinished (2 movements only); movement II completed by Vadim Borisovsky in 1932 and Bart Berman in 1999
|- valign="top"
| Chamber music || align=center|1830 || Квартет F-dur || String Quartet in F major || for 2 violins, viola and cello || also arranged for piano 4-hands
|- valign="top"
| Chamber music || align=center|1832 || Блестящий дивертисмент на мотивы из оперы «Сомнамбула» В. Беллини || Divertimento Brilliante on Themes from Bellini's Opera "La sonnambula" in A major || for piano with 2 violins, cello and double bass || also for 2 pianos 6-hands
|- valign="top"
| Chamber music || align=center|1832 || Большой секстет || Grand Sextet in E major || for 2 violins, viola, cello, double bass and piano || a.k.a. Gran sestetto originale
|- valign="top"
| Chamber music || align=center|1832 || Серенада на некоторые мотивы из оперы «Анна Болейн» Г. Доницетти || Serenade on Themes from Donizetti's Opera "Anna Bolena" in E major || for piano, harp, bassoon, horn, viola, cello and double bass ||
|- valign="top"
| Chamber music || align=center|1832 || Патетическое трио || Trio Pathétique in D minor || for clarinet, bassoon and piano  (or violin, cello and piano) || 
|- valign="top"
| Piano || align=center|1822 || Вариации на тему Моцарта || Variations on a Theme from Mozart's Opera "Die Zauberflöte" in E major || for piano or harp ||
|- valign="top"
| Piano || align=center|1824? || Вариации на собственную тему || Variations on an Original Theme in F major || for piano ||
|- valign="top"
| Piano || align=center|1826 || Вариации на русскую песню «Среди долины ровныя» || Variations on a Russian Song "Among the Gentle Valleys" in A minor || for piano ||
|- valign="top"
| Piano || align=center|1826 || Вариации на романс «Benedetta sia la madre» || Variations on the Song "Benedetta sia la madre" in E major || for piano ||
|- valign="top"
| Piano || align=center|1826 or 1827 || Вариации на тему из оперы «Фаниска» Л. Керубини || Variations on a Theme from Cherubini's Opera "Faniska" in B major || for piano ||
|- valign="top"
| Piano || align=center|1826? || Французская кадриль || 5 New French Contradances || for piano || a.k.a. 5 Nouvelles quadrilles françaises
|- valign="top"
| Piano || align=center|by 1828 || Новые контрдансы || 4 New Contradances || for piano ||
|- valign="top"
| Piano || align=center|by 1828 || Котильон || Cotillon in B major || for piano ||
|- valign="top"
| Piano || align=center|by 1828 || Мазурка G-dur || Mazurka in G major || for piano ||
|- valign="top"
| Piano || align=center|1828 || Ноктюрн || Nocturne in E major || for piano or harp ||
|- valign="top"
| Piano || align=center|1829 || Финская песна || Finnish Song in D major || for piano ||
|- valign="top"
| Piano || align=center|1829 or 1830 || Кавалерийская рысь || Sabre Dance in C major || for piano 4-hands || a.k.a. Trot de cavalerie
|- valign="top"
| Piano || align=center|1829 or 1830 || Кавалерийская рысь || Sabre Dance in G major || for piano 4-hands || a.k.a. Trot de cavalerie
|- valign="top"
| Piano || align=center|1830 || Квартет F-dur || String Quartet in F major || for piano 4-hands || version for piano 4-hands
|- valign="top"
| Piano || align=center|1831 || Прощальный вальс || Farewell Waltz in G major || for piano || a.k.a. Valse d'adieux
|- valign="top"
| Piano || align=center|1831 || Блестящее рондо на темы из оперы «Монтекки и Капулетти» В. Беллини || Rondo Brillante on Themes from Bellini's Opera "I Capuleti e i Montecchi" in B major || for piano ||
|- valign="top"
| Piano || align=center|1831 || Блестящие вариации на тему из оперы «Анна Болейн» Г. Доницетти || Variations Brillante on a Theme from Donizetti's Opera "Anna Bolena" in A major || for piano ||
|- valign="top"
| Piano || align=center|1831 || Вариации на две темы из балета «Киа-Кинг» || Variations on Two Themes from the Ballet "Chao-Kang" in D major || for piano || Chao-Kang, Ballet-Pantomime in 3 acts and epilogue (premiered 1834 at Salle Ventadour); choreography by Louis Henry; music by Luigi Carlini
|- valign="top"
| Piano || align=center|1832 || Блестящий дивертисмент на мотивы из оперы «Сомнамбула» В. Беллини || Divertimento Brilliante on Themes from Bellini's Opera "La sonnambula" in A major || for 2 pianos 6-hands || original for piano with 2 violins, cello and double bass
|- valign="top"
| Piano || align=center|1832 || Экспромт в форме галопа на тему из оперы «Любовный напиток» Г. Доницетти || Impromptu-Galop on a Theme from Donizetti's Opera "L'elisir d'amore" in B major || for piano 4-hands || a.k.a. Impromptu en Galop
|- valign="top"
| Piano || align=center|1832 || Вариации на тему из оперы «Монтекки и Капулетти» В. Беллини || Variations on a Theme from Bellini's Opera "I Capuleti e i Montecchi" in C major || for piano ||
|- valign="top"
| Piano || align=center|1833 || Вариации на романс «Соловей» А. Алябьева || Variations on Alyabyev's Song "The Nightingale" in E minor || for piano ||
|- valign="top"
| Piano || align=center|1833 or 1834 || Три фуги  || 3 Fugues  || for piano ||
|- valign="top"
| Piano || align=center|1833 or 1834 || Мазурка || Mazurka in A major || for piano ||
|- valign="top"
| Piano || align=center|1833 or 1834 || Мазурка || Mazurka in F major || for piano ||
|- valign="top"
| Piano || align=center|1834 || Каприччио на русские темы || Capriccio on Russian Themes in A major || for piano 4-hands ||
|- valign="top"
| Piano || align=center|1834–1836? || Патриотическая песня || Patriotic Song in C major || for piano || a.k.a. Motif de chant national; music used as the national anthem of Russia (1990–2000)
|- valign="top"
| Piano || align=center|1835? || Мазурка || Mazurka in F major || for piano || a.k.a. "Masurque dédiée à sa femme"
|- valign="top"
| Piano || align=center|1838 || Контрданс || 5 Contradances || for piano || dated 1839 in some publications
|- valign="top"
| Piano || align=center|1838 || Вальс || Waltz in B major || for piano ||
|- valign="top"
| Piano || align=center|1838 || Вальс (Мелодический вальс) || Waltz in E major || for piano || dated 1839 in some publications
|- valign="top"
| Piano || align=center|1838 or 1839 || Галопада || Galopade in E major || for piano ||
|- valign="top"
| Piano || align=center|1839 || Монастырка. Новый контрданс || La Conventine, 5 New Contradances || for piano || original for orchestra (lost)
|- valign="top"
| Piano || align=center|1839 || Разлука. Ноктюрн || La Séparation, Nocturne in F minor || for piano ||
|- valign="top"
| Piano || align=center|1839 || Большой вальс || Grand Waltz in G major || for piano || a.k.a. Grande valse; original for orchestra (lost)
|- valign="top"
| Piano || align=center|1839 || Польский || Polonaise in E major || for piano || original for orchestra (lost)
|- valign="top"
| Piano || align=center|1839 || Le Regret, Ноктюрн || Le Regret, Nocturne || for piano || lost
|- valign="top"
| Piano || align=center|1839 || Вальс-фантазия || Waltz-Fantasia in B minor || for piano || a.k.a. Valse-Fantaisie|- valign="top"
| Piano || align=center|1840 || Болеро («О, дева чидная моя») || Bolero in D minor || for piano ||
|- valign="top"
| Piano || align=center|1843 || Тарантелла на русскую тему || Tarantella on a Russian Folk Song in A minor || for piano || theme: «Во поле береза стояла» (In the Field There Stood a Birch Tree)
|- valign="top"
| Piano || align=center|1843? || Мазурка || Mazurka in C minor || for piano ||
|- valign="top"
| Piano || align=center|1847 || Привет отчизне  || A Greeting to My Native Land  || for piano || 4 Musical Essays  2. Barcarolle  3. a.k.a. Prière; choral version (1855); after the poem by Mikhail Lermontov  4. a.k.a. Thème écossais varié; theme: The Last Rose of Summer|- valign="top"
| Piano || align=center|1849 || Полька || Polka in D minor || for piano ||
|- valign="top"
| Piano || align=center|1852 || Мазурка || Mazurka in C major || for piano ||
|- valign="top"
| Piano || align=center|1852 || Полька || Polka in B major || for piano 4-hands || conceived in 1840
|- valign="top"
| Piano || align=center|1854 || Детская полька || Children's Polka in B major || for piano || a.k.a. Polka Enfantine|- valign="top"
| Piano || align=center|1855? || Las Mollares. Андалузский танец || Las Mollares, Andalusian Dance in G major || for piano ||
|- valign="top"
| Piano || align=center| || Leggieramente || Leggieramente in E major || for piano || published 1969
|- valign="top"
| Piano || align=center| || Мазурка || Mazurka in A minor || for piano ||
|- valign="top"
| Choral || align=center|1826 || Пролог на кончину императора Александра I и восшествие на престол Николая I || Prologue on the Death of Emperor Alexander I and the Accession to the Throne of Nicholas I "Pleurons, pleurons sur le russie" || for tenor, mixed chorus, piano and double bass || Cantata; words by Olidor; Russian words by Ilya Fyodorovich Tiumenev (Илья Федорович Тюменев)
|- valign="top"
| Choral || align=center|  || Русская песня || Russian Song || for voice, chorus and piano || words by Anton Delvig
|- valign="top"
| Choral || align=center|1828 || La notte omai s'appresso || La notte omai s'appresso || for soprano, alto, tenor, bass, mixed chorus and string orchestra || incomplete
|- valign="top"
| Choral || align=center|1828 or 1834 || A, ignobil core || A, ignobil core || for baritone, male chorus and orchestra || incomplete
|- valign="top"
| Choral || align=center|1837 || Херувимская || Cherubim's Song in C major || for mixed chorus || Biblical text
|- valign="top"
| Choral || align=center|1837 || Велик наш бог || Our God Is Great || for mixed chorus and orchestra || Polonaise; words by Vladimir Sollogub and Nikolai Khmelnitsky (Николай Иванович Хмельницкий)
|- valign="top"
| Choral || align=center|1838 || Гимн хозяину || Hymn to the Master || for tenor, mixed chorus and orchestra || words by Mykola Markevych
|- valign="top"
| Choral || align=center|1847 || Заздравная песня || Toasting Song || for voice and chorus || traditional words
|- valign="top"
| Choral || align=center|1850 || Прощальная песня для воспитанниц общества благородних девиц || Farewell Song for the Pupils of the Society of Genteel Maidens || for female chorus and orchestra || words by M. Timaev (М. Тимаев)
|- valign="top"
| Choral || align=center|1854 || Коса || The Scythe || for voice, mixed chorus and orchestra || words by Alexander Rimsky-Korsakov (Александр Яковлевич Римский-Корсаков)
|- valign="top"
| Choral || align=center|1855 || Молитва || Prayer || for voice, mixed chorus and orchestra || original for piano (1947); words by Mikhail Lermontov
|- valign="top"
| Choral || align=center|1856? || Лектения первая || First Litany || for mixed chorus ||
|- valign="top"
| Vocal || align=center|1824 || Моя арфа || My Harp || for voice and piano || words by Konstantin Bakhturin (Константин Александрович Бахтурин)
|- valign="top"
| Vocal || align=center|1825 || Не искушай меня без нужды || Do Not Tempt Me Needlessly || for voice and piano  for 2 voices and piano || 2 versions: for voice and piano, and for 2 voices and piano; words by Evgeny Baratynsky
|- valign="top"
| Vocal || align=center|1826 || Ах ты, душечка, красна девицка || Ah, My Sweet, Thou Art a Beautiful Maiden || for voice and piano || folk song
|- valign="top"
| Vocal || align=center|1826 || Утешение || Consolation || for voice and piano || 2 versions; words by Vasily Zhukovsky
|- valign="top"
| Vocal || align=center|1826 || Бедный певец || The Poor Singer || for voice and piano || words by Vasily Zhukovsky
|- valign="top"
| Vocal || align=center|1827 || Горько, горько мне, красной девице || Bitter, Bitter It Is for Me || for voice and piano || words by Alexander Rimsky-Korsakov (Александр Яковлевич Римский-Корсаков)
|- valign="top"
| Vocal || align=center|1827 || Память сердца || Heart's Memory || for voice and piano || words by Konstantin Batyushkov
|- valign="top"
| Vocal || align=center|1827 || Я люблю, ты мне твердила || "I Love" Was Your Assurance || for voice and piano || words by Alexander Rimsky-Korsakov (Александр Яковлевич Римский-Корсаков); a.k.a. Le Baiser with French words (1854) by Prince Sergei Grigoryevich Golitsyn (Сергей Григорьевич Голицын)
|- valign="top"
| Vocal || align=center|1827 || Что, красотка молодая || Why Do You Cry, Young Beauty || for voice and piano || words by Anton Delvig
|- valign="top"
| Vocal || align=center|1827 or 1828 || Mio ben ricordati (Если вдруг средь радостей) ||  || for alto, tenor and piano  for soprano and piano || 2 versions; Italian words by Metastasio; Russian words by Pyotr Ilyich Tchaikovsky
|- valign="top"
| Vocal || align=center|1827 or 1828 || Боже сил, во дни смятенья || O God, Preserve Our Strength in the Days of Confusion || for alto, tenor, bass and piano || Biblical text
|- valign="top"
| Vocal || align=center|1827 or 1828 || Один лишь миг || Pour un moment || for voice and piano || French and Russian words by Prince Sergei Grigoryevich Golitsyn (Сергей Григорьевич Голицын)
|- valign="top"
| Vocal || align=center|1827 or 1828 || Скажи зачем || Tell Me Why || for voice and piano || words by Prince Sergei Grigoryevich Golitsyn (Сергей Григорьевич Голицын)
|- valign="top"
| Vocal || align=center|1828 || Разочарование || Disenchantment || for voice and piano || 2 versions; words by Prince Sergei Grigoryevich Golitsyn (Сергей Григорьевич Голицын)
|- valign="top"
| Vocal || align=center|1828 || Куда ни взгляну || Dovunque il guargo giro || for baritone and piano || Italian words by Metastasio; Russian words by Vsevolod Rozhdestvensky
|- valign="top"
| Vocal || align=center|1828 || Две итальянсие канцонетты  || Due canzonette italiane  || for voice and piano || words by Metastasio
|- valign="top"
| Vocal || align=center|1828 || Смертный час настал нежданный || Ho perduto il mio tesoro || for tenor and piano || Italian words by Metastasio; Russian words by Pyotr Ilyich Tchaikovsky
|- valign="top"
| Vocal || align=center|1828 || Дедушка! – девицы раз мне говорили || The Maids Once Told Me, Grandfather || for voice and piano || 2 versions; words by Anton Delvig
|- valign="top"
| Vocal || align=center|1828 || Тоска мне больно сердце жмет || Mi sento il cor trafiggere || for tenor and piano || Italian words by Metastasio; Russian words by Pyotr Ilyich Tchaikovsky
|- valign="top"
| Vocal || align=center|1828 || О, Дафна моя прекрасная || O Dafni che di quest'anima amabile diletto || for soprano and piano || Russian words by Vsevolod Rozhdestvensky
|- valign="top"
| Vocal || align=center|1828 || Ах ты, ночь ли, ноченька || O Thou Black Night || for voice and piano || 2 versions; words by Anton Delvig
|- valign="top"
| Vocal || align=center|1828 || Волей богов я знаю || Pensa que questo instante || for alto and piano || Italian words by Metastasio; Russian words by Vsevolod Rozhdestvensky
|- valign="top"
| Vocal || align=center|1828 || Как в вольных просторах || Piangendo ancora rinascer suole || for soprano and piano || Italian words by Metastasio; Russian words by Vsevolod Rozhdestvensky
|- valign="top"
| Vocal || align=center|1828 || Молитва «С небеси услыши»  «На уснувший мир нисходит тишь ночная» || Prayer || for soprano, alto, tenor, bass and piano || Quartet in B major
|- valign="top"
| Vocal || align=center|1828 || Я в волшебном сновиденье || Pur nel sonno || for soprano and piano || Italian words by Metastasio; Russian words by Pyotr Ilyich Tchaikovsky
|- valign="top"
| Vocal || align=center|1828 || Забуду ль я... || Shall I Forget... || for voice and piano || words by Prince Sergei Grigoryevich Golitsyn (Сергей Григорьевич Голицын)
|- valign="top"
| Vocal || align=center|1828 || Не пой, красавица, при мне || Sing Not, Thou Beauty, in My Presence || for voice and piano || words by Alexander Pushkin
|- valign="top"
| Vocal || align=center|1828 || Помни, что счастье на свете призрак мгновенный || Sogna chi crede d'esser felice || for alto, 2 tenors, bass and string orchestra || Quartet; Russian translation by Vsevolod Rozhdestvensky
|- valign="top"
| Vocal || align=center|1828 || Скоро узы Гименея || Tu sei figlia || for soprano and piano || Italian words by Metastasio; Russian words by Pyotr Ilyich Tchaikovsky
|- valign="top"
| Vocal || align=center|1828 or 1829 || Come di gloria al nome || Come di gloria al nome || for soprano, alto, tenor, bass and string orchestra ||
|- valign="top"
| Vocal || align=center|1829 || Голос с того света || A Voice from the Other World || for voice and piano || words by Friedrich Schiller in translation by Vasily Zhukovsky
|- valign="top"
| Vocal || align=center|1829 || Ночь осенняя || O Gentle Autumn Night || for voice and piano || words by Alexander Rimsky-Korsakov (Александр Яковлевич Римский-Корсаков)
|- valign="top"
| Vocal || align=center|1829 or 1830 || Семь этюдов для контральто || 7 Studies || for alto and piano ||
|- valign="top"
| Vocal || align=center|1832 || Пробедитель || The Conqueror || for voice and piano || words by Ludwig Uhland in translation by Vasily Zhukovsky
|- valign="top"
| Vocal || align=center|1832 || Желание || Il desiderio || for voice and piano || words by Felice Romani
|- valign="top"
| Vocal || align=center|1832 || Ариа для сопрано «В суде неправом» || L'iniquo voto || for soprano and piano || words by Pini
|- valign="top"
| Vocal || align=center|1832 || Венецианская ночь || Venetian Night || for voice and piano || Fantasia; 2 versions; words by Ivan Kozlov
|- valign="top"
| Vocal || align=center|1833 || Шесть этюдов || 6 Studies || for soprano and piano ||
|- valign="top"
| Vocal || align=center|1834 || Дубрава шумит || The Leafy Grove Howls || for voice and piano || words by Friedrich Schiller in translation by Vasily Zhukovsky
|- valign="top"
| Vocal || align=center|1834 || Не говори: любовь пройдет || Say Not That Love Will Pass || for voice and piano || words by Anton Delvig
|- valign="top"
| Vocal || align=center|1834, 1855 || Не называй ее небесной || Call Her Not Heavenly || for voice and piano || orchestrated 1855; words by Nikolai Filippovich Pavlov (Николай Филиппович Павлов)
|- valign="top"
| Vocal || align=center|1834 || Я здесь, Инезилья || I Am Here, Inezilla || for voice and piano || words by Alexander Pushkin after Barry Cornwall
|- valign="top"
| Vocal || align=center|1834 || Только узнал я тебя || I Had But Recognized You || for voice and piano || words by Anton Delvig
|- valign="top"
| Vocal || align=center|1835 or 1836 || Упражнения для усовершенствования голоса || Exercises for Smoothing and Perfecting the Voice || for voice and piano ||
|- valign="top"
| Vocal || align=center|1836 ||  || Comic Canon a 4 || for voice and piano || composed in collaboration with Vladimir Odoevsky; words by Alexander Pushkin, Vasily Zhukovsky, Pyotr Vyazemsky, M. Wielhorski
|- valign="top"
| Vocal || align=center|1836 || Ночной смотр || The Night Review || for voice and piano || Fantasia; orchestrated c.1836–1840; reorchestrated 1855; words by Vasily Zhukovsky
|- valign="top"
| Vocal || align=center|1837 || Где наша роза || Where Is Our Rose? || for voice and piano || 3 versions; words by Alexander Pushkin
|- valign="top"
| Vocal || align=center|1837 || Станцы. Вот место тайного свиданья || Stanzas: This Secret Meeting Place || for voice and piano || words by Nestor Kukolnik
|- valign="top"
| Vocal || align=center|1837 or 1838 || Вы не придете вновь || Will You Not Return || for 2 sopranos and piano || Duettino; words by the composer
|- valign="top"
| Vocal || align=center|1838 || Сомнение || Doubt || for voice and piano || words by Nestor Kukolnik  
|- valign="top"
| Vocal || align=center|1838 || В крови горит огонь желанья || The Fire of Longing Burns in My Heart || for voice and piano || words by Alexander Pushkin
|- valign="top"
| Vocal || align=center|1838 || Ночной зефир || The Night Zephir || for voice and piano || words by Alexander Pushkin
|- valign="top"
| Vocal || align=center|1838 || Не щебечи, соловейку || Sing Not, O Nightingale || for voice and piano || Ukrainian Song; words by Victor Zabella (Виктор Николаевич Забелла)
|- valign="top"
| Vocal || align=center|1838 || Гуде вітер вельми в полі... || The Wind Blows || for voice and piano || Ukrainian Song; words by Victor Zabella (Виктор Николаевич Забелла)
|- valign="top"
| Vocal || align=center|1839 || Зацветет черемуха || The Cherry Tree Is Blooming || for voice and piano || words by Yevdokiya Rostopchina
|- valign="top"
| Vocal || align=center|1839 || Признание || Declaration || for voice and piano || words by Alexander Pushkin
|- valign="top"
| Vocal || align=center|1839 || Если встречусь с тобой || If I Shall Meet You || for voice and piano || words by Aleksey Koltsov
|- valign="top"
| Vocal || align=center|1839 || Свадебная песня «Дивный терем стоит» || Wedding Song || for voice and piano || a.k.a. The North Star; words by Yevdokiya Rostopchina
|- valign="top"
| Vocal || align=center|1840 || Прощальной песни воспитанниц Екатерининского института при их выпуске || Farewell Song of Pupils of the Yekaterinsky Institute || for voice and piano || words by Platon Obodovsky (Платон Григорьевич Ободовский)
|- valign="top"
| Vocal || align=center|1840 || Прощание с Петрбургом  || A Farewell to Saint Petersburg  || for voice and piano || words by Nestor Kukolnik     2. from Prince Kholmsky  3. original for piano     5. also for voice and string orchestra                 11. based on Le regret for piano  12. for voice, male chorus and piano
|- valign="top"
| Vocal || align=center|1840 || Как сладко с тобою мне быть || How Sweet It Is to Be with You || for voice and piano || words by Pyotr Ryndin (Петр Рындин)
|- valign="top"
| Vocal || align=center|1840 || Я помню чудное мгновенье || I Recall a Wonderful Moment || for voice and piano || words by Alexander Pushkin
|- valign="top"
| Vocal || align=center|1840 or 1841 || Четыре эксерсиса || 4 Exercises || for voice and piano ||
|- valign="top"
| Vocal || align=center|1842 || Люблю тебя, милая роза || I Love You, Dear Rose || for voice and piano || words by I. Samarin (И. Самарин)
|- valign="top"
| Vocal || align=center|1843 || К ней || To Her || for voice and piano || words by Adam Mickiewicz in translation by Prince Sergei Grigoryevich Golitsyn (Сергей Григорьевич Голицын)
|- valign="top"
| Vocal || align=center|1847 || Милочка || Darling || for voice and piano || words by anonymous
|- valign="top"
| Vocal || align=center|1847 || Ты скоро меня позабудешь || Soon You Will Forget Me || for voice and piano || orchestrated 1955; words by Yulia Zhadovskaya
|- valign="top"
| Vocal || align=center|1847 || Песнь Маргариты || Meine Ruh' ist hin || for voice and piano || words from Goethe's Faust in translation by Eduard Ivanovich Guber (Эдуард Иванович Губер)
|- valign="top"
| Vocal || align=center|1848 || Заздравный кубок || The Toasting Cup || for voice and piano || words by Alexander Pushkin
|- valign="top"
| Vocal || align=center|1848 || Слышу ли голос твой || When I Hear Your Voice || for voice and piano || words by Mikhail Lermontov
|- valign="top"
| Vocal || align=center|1849 || Адель || Adèle || for voice and piano || words by Alexander Pushkin
|- valign="top"
| Vocal || align=center|1849 || Rozmowa. Fantazya di spiewu || Conversation || for voice and piano || words by Adam Mickiewicz
|- valign="top"
| Vocal || align=center|1849 || Мери || Mary || for voice and piano || words by Alexander Pushkin after Barry Cornwall
|- valign="top"
| Vocal || align=center|1850 || Финский залив || The Gulf of Finland || for voice and piano || a.k.a. Palermo; words by Platon Obodovsky (Платон Григорьевич Ободовский)
|- valign="top"
| Vocal || align=center|1856 || Ах, когда б я прежде знала... || Oh, If I Had Known... || for voice and piano || words by Ivan Dmitriev
|- valign="top"
| Vocal || align=center|1856 || Не говори, что сердцу больно || Say Not That It Grieves the Heart || for voice and piano || words by Nikolai Filippovich Pavlov (Николай Филиппович Павлов)
|- valign="top"
| Vocal || align=center|1856? || Да исправиця молитва моя || Let My Prayer Be Fulfilled || for 2 tenors and baritone ||
|- valign="top"
| Vocal || align=center|1856 or 1857 || Гимн воскресения || Resurrection Hymn || for 2 tenors and baritone ||
|- valign="top"
| Vocal || align=center|1856 or 1857 || Школа пения || School of Singing ||  ||
|}

Sources
 Shebalin, V., Pavchinsky, S. editors, et al. M. I. Glinka: Complete Collection of Works'' (М. И. Глинка: Полное Собрание Сочинений), Izdatelstvo Muzyka, Moscow (1955–1973).
 Grove Dictionary of Music and Musicians

External links
 Complete list of works 
 List of works 

Glinka